Michele Grella (born January 23, 1987) is an American former professional soccer player who played as a forward and winger, who is currently a soccer analyst for CBS Sports Network and Paramount+.

Club career

Youth and amateur
Grella was born in Glen Cove, New York and had a highly successful youth career playing as a striker. He was a 2003 and 2004 Parade Magazine High School All American soccer player and the 2004 NSCAA National High School Player of the Year for the Glen Cove Big Red.  He led his club team, the Albertson Red Storm, to both the 2003 and 2004 USYSA National Championships and the Red Storm Academy to the 2004 Super Y-League Championship. Grella played college soccer for Duke University where he was a 2008 first team All American.

During the 2007 collegiate offseason, he played for the Long Island Rough Riders in the fourth division USL Premier Development League for coach Mike Mackney. In 2008, he played five more games for Long Island before switching to play for the Cary RailHawks U23's mid-season.

Leeds United

2008–09 season
In February 2009, he was drafted in the third round (34th overall) of the 2009 MLS SuperDraft by Toronto FC. However, Grella decided against signing for the Canadian club, and instead tried his luck at playing in Europe.  Grella went on trial with Leeds United in January 2009, and scored a hat-trick for the club's reserves on the 21st of that month against Barnsley FC.
He also scored a goal in a behind closed doors game, with news of a permanent deal pending. He signed a full-time contract for Leeds United on transfer deadline day, 2 February 2009, until the end of the 2009–10 season.

He made his Leeds debut on 14 February 2009, after coming on as a 74th minute substitute for Lee Trundle in a 1–0 defeat to Huddersfield Town. His first season in professional football was mainly spent making short cameos as a substitute during Leeds fight for promotion. He came on late in Leeds' playoff semi final against Millwall but was unable to grab a goal during his first team appearances for Leeds.

2009–10 season
Grella scored his first senior goal for Leeds in a pre-season friendly against Burnley. On 10 August 2009 he was voted Man Of The Match in a League Cup match against Darlington although he didn't score. He signed a new long-term contract with Leeds.

Grella had to wait just over seven months for his first league start. Replacing the injured Jermaine Beckford in the starting line up for the visit of Stockport County to Elland Road on 5 September 2009, it took him just eight minutes to score his first league goal, curling in an opportunistic effort from the edge of the penalty area.

Grella scored for Leeds after coming on as a late substitute in the 2–0 FA Cup win against Oldham. He repeated this FA Cup goalscoring form on 8 December 2009 in the FA Cup replay against Kettering Town, coming on as a substitute during the second period of extra time. Grella's introduction changed the pace of the game (which had previously been 1–1), as he scored twice as Leeds won the game 5–1, taking his tally to four for Leeds. Grella started for Leeds in the Football League Trophy game against Accrington Stanley. Grella was substituted in the same game and replaced by Sam Vokes. Grella was an unused substitute for Leeds' victory away to Manchester United in the FA Cup third round. Grella started Leeds' Football League Trophy Northern Area Final first leg against Carlisle United, and he was substituted late in the second half by Luciano Becchio.

Grella's fifth goal of the season for Leeds came in Football League Trophy Northern Area Final second leg against Carlisle United. With Grella coming on as a second-half substitute and scoring the late winner to send the tie to penalties, one of which Grella converted in the shootout, but Leeds ended up crashing out of the tournament after losing 6–5 on penalties. After coming on as a first-half substitute against Norwich City, Grella was given a start against Swindon Town after Luciano Becchio's head injury ruled him out. Grella dropped back onto the bench for the rest of the season, and was limited to late substitute appearances. Leeds were promoted as League 1 runners up after beating Bristol Rovers. Over the course of the season Grella was unable to break up the 48 goal partnership that consisted of Jermaine Beckford and Luciano Becchio and had to settle for a role mainly as a substitute.

2010–11 season
He made his first appearance in The Championship when he came on in the opening fixture as a second-half substitute in the loss to Derby County and remained on Leeds' bench as an unused substitute in the opening fixtures. After the arrival of Ross McCormack and the emergence of Davide Somma saw Grella dropped down the pecking order at Leeds, Grella was set to go out on loan in order to gain some more first team experience, on transfer deadline day he turned down a loan move to League Two side Oxford United. To help maintain match fitness, Grella played 90 minutes in Leeds' 3–1 behind closed doors friendly win against Middlesbrough on 14 September, scoring a brace in the process. On 22 September 2010, Grella turned down the opportunity of joining Bradford City on loan. Simon Grayson revealed his disappointment that Grella turned down the loan move as he wanted him to get a regular run of games out on loan.

Carlisle United and Swindon Town loan spells
On 12 October 2010, Grella joined Carlisle United on a month's loan to gain some more first team experience and gain regular football. He joined fellow Leeds loanee Ľubo Michalík who was already at the club. Grella made his debut as a second-half substitute against Exeter City, he started the next game against Charlton, and scored his first goal for Carlisle against Charlton Athletic. He scored in his second consecutive game against Bristol Rovers. Leeds refused permission for Grella to play for Carlisle in the FA Cup against Tipton Town. After impressing during his first month at Carlisle, Grella's loan was extended to 1 January 2011, with Leeds including a 24-hour recall clause if he is needed. Carlisle had requested to loan Grella for the entire season but had that request turned down by Ken Bates. On 20 November, Grella scored his third goal for Carlisle against Walsall.

On 20 January 2011, Scottish Premier League side Motherwell announced they had signed Grella on loan until the end of the 2010–11 season. Grella returned to Leeds the following day, however, when it became clear that he could not play for Motherwell as he had already played for two different clubs (Leeds and Carlisle) earlier in the season.

On 24 February 2011, Grella agreed to join Swindon Town on loan until the end of the 2010–11 season. Grella scored his first goal for Swindon against Dagenham & Redbridge on 12 March. This spell ended on 12 April after Grella decided he was being overlooked since Paul Hart took charge, despite making five starts in seven games. He returned to Leeds but was unable to play for Leeds until his loan at Swindon had expired at the end of the season.

2011–12 season
Leeds chairman, Ken Bates announced on 12 May that Grella was to be transfer listed by Leeds as he didn't figure in the club's future plans.

On 8 June, Grella was given permission to train with American team New York Cosmos, the move was with a view to a permanent deal. However, Grella said whilst it was an interesting opportunity he was looking to stay at a club in England. After training with the Cosmos, Grella returned to pre-season training with Leeds, but revealed on his Twitter account that he was 99% sure he would be leaving Leeds. Grella played against Bradford Park Avenue in a pre season friendly, he then played for a Leeds 11 in a behind closed doors friendly against Leicester City scoring twice. He then was set to play for a Leeds reserve 11 against Farsley Celtic.

Brentford
On 26 August 2011, Mike Grella joined League One side Brentford on an emergency loan deal.  Grella's contract with Leeds United was due to be terminated later in the week so that Grella could sign a permanent deal and signed a deal that ran run until the end of the season. During his loan emergency loan move for Brentford, Grella made his debut in a 2–0 loss against Tranmere Rovers. Following his permanent move to Brentford, Grella made his debut in a 1–1 draw against Colchester United. On 8 November 2011, on his first full start for the club, Grella hit four goals in a six nil victory over Bournemouth in the JPT Trophy. However once again, he failed to establish himself in Brentford boss Uwe Rosler's plans.

On 14 February, Grella left the club after having his contract terminated by mutual consent.

Bury
Following his release from Brentford, Bury completed the signing of Grella on a short-term contract until the end of the 2011/2012 season on 27 February 2012. One day after signing for the club on 28 February 2012, Grella made his debut for the club in a 2–1 loss against Hartlepool United. On 10 March 2012, Grella provided assist for Giles Coke to score against Carlisle United to take a lead, only to lose 4–1. On 9 April 2012, Grella scored his first goal in a 4–1 win over Colchester United. 5 Days later on 14 April 2012, Grella scored his second goal to score the only goal in the game in a 1–0 win over Bournemouth. On 21 April 2012, Grella scored a brace and provided assist for David Worrall to score the first goal in the game in a 4–2 victory over Notts County. This win helped to ensure League 1 safety for the Shakers and gave Notts County play-off hopes a huge blow.

Having scored four goals in his short spell with the club, manager Richard Barker offered Grella a new deal for the 2012–13 season. However, Grella rejected a new deal after agreeing terms with an as yet unnamed club. After his move, Barker says that "He became extremely popular with the fans, the players and my (Richard Barker) staff".

Scunthorpe United 
After rejecting a new deal in favour of joining an unnamed club, a number of League One and League Two clubs had been tracking him, including Bradford City and Scunthorpe United.
Grella publicly stated that he wished to join the Iron and that talks were at an advanced stage, after manager Alan Knill publicly declared interest in the striker.  On 9 July, Grella confirmed that he had signed a two-year deal with Scunthorpe. He made his competitive debut for Scunthorpe on 14 August, in a League Cup first round match against Derby County, also scoring in their 5-5 eventual victory.

Viborg
Grella was released at the end of the 2012–13 season by mutual consent. He signed with Viborg FF in the Danish Superliga in October 2013. He left the club at the end of 2013 after appearing in only 2 league matches as a substitute.

RailHawks
Grella signed with the Carolina RailHawks in April 2014 for the spring season of the North American Soccer League. On 17 May 2014 Grella scored his first goal for the club in a 2–0 victory over the Atlanta Silverbacks converting a penalty kick to help Carolina to a 1–0 lead. On 31 May 2014 before a regular season record crowd at WakeMed Soccer Park, Grella scored the opening goal in a 2–0 victory over the Tampa Bay Rowdies.

New York Red Bulls

On 17 February 2015, Grella signed with New York Red Bulls of Major League Soccer after a successful trial spell. Grella made his debut for New York on 8 March 2015 appearing as a starter in a 1–1 draw at Sporting Kansas City.

On 28 March 2015, Grella scored his first goal for New York and the 1,000th goal in club history in a 2–1 victory over Columbus Crew. On 17 April 2015, Grella scored his second goal of the season for New York in a 2–0 victory over the San Jose Earthquakes. On 5 June 2015, Grella scored his third goal of the season in a 4–2 loss versus the Houston Dynamo. On 24 June 2015, Grella scored New York's lone goal in a 1–0 victory over Real Salt Lake. On 1 July 2015, Grella scored his fifth goal of the season for New York, helping the Red Bulls to a 4–1 victory in the U.S. Open Cup over local rival New York Cosmos.

On 19 July 2015, Grella scored his sixth goal of the season in a 2–0 victory over Orlando City. On 11 September 2015, Grella helped New York to a 3–2 come from behind victory over Chicago Fire SC scoring the equalizing goal. On 18 October 2015, in a 4–1 victory over Philadelphia Union, Grella scored 7 seconds into the match, the fastest goal in MLS history, surpassing former Red Bull, Tim Cahill. Grella added another goal in the match, helping New York clinch the Eastern Conference regular season title. After a breakout 2015 season, supporters began calling him "Grelladinho" due to his style of play, flashy goals and ability to take on defenders with skillful dribbling.

On 19 March 2016, Grella scored his first goal of the season in helping New York to a 4-3 come from behind victory over Houston Dynamo. On 24 April 2016, Grella scored his second goal of the season and assisted on another in helping New York to a 3-2 come from behind victory over Orlando City SC. On April 29, 2016, Grella helped New York to a 4–0 victory against FC Dallas scoring his third goal of the season. On 19 June 2016, Grella scored two goals in a 2–0 victory against the Seattle Sounders FC. His performance earned him MLS Player of the week honors.

Columbus Crew SC
After an injury-shortened 2017 season, New York declined Grella's 2018 contract option and he entered the 2017 MLS Re-Entry Draft, held on 15 December 2017. Grella was selected in the first round by Colorado Rapids and immediately traded to Columbus Crew SC in exchange for a second-round pick in the 2019 MLS SuperDraft.

Grella made his debut for Columbus on 28 April 2018 appearing as a substitute in the 65th minute and scoring the game-winning goal in a 2–1 win at home. His contract option would be declined by the club at the end of the season, after he had appeared in 12 games with one goal.

International career
Grella has represented the United States at both under-18 and under-20 level. He holds both US and Italian passports. Grella admitted he was looking to be called up by the full USA national side, and was hoping to break into the World Cup squad, but he said his lack of playing time at Leeds made the opportunity of a call up very slim.

Honors
Leeds United
Football League One Runners up: 2009–10

New York Red Bulls
MLS Supporters' Shield: 2015

Career statistics

Personal life
He spends his time off with his family – wife Jessica and their children Michele Joseph and Liliana June, mother Grazia, father Michele Sr., and brother Frank – back in Glen Cove, NY. His family is originally from Sturno, province of Avellino in Italy. He is an ardent supporter of Italian Serie A side Juventus F.C.

As of April 2022, he is currently a Serie A analyst at Paramount+.

References

External links
 
 
 
 
 Duke University player profile 

1987 births
Living people
American soccer players
Association football commentators
Association football forwards
Duke Blue Devils men's soccer players
Cary Clarets players
Long Island Rough Riders players
Leeds United F.C. players
Carlisle United F.C. players
Swindon Town F.C. players
Brentford F.C. players
Bury F.C. players
Scunthorpe United F.C. players
Viborg FF players
North Carolina FC players
New York Red Bulls players
Columbus Crew players
USL League Two players
English Football League players
Danish Superliga players
North American Soccer League players
Major League Soccer players
Expatriate footballers in England
Expatriate men's footballers in Denmark
American expatriate soccer players
American expatriate sportspeople in Denmark
American people of Italian descent
Sportspeople from Glen Cove, New York
Soccer players from New York (state)
Toronto FC draft picks
United States men's youth international soccer players
United States men's under-20 international soccer players
All-American men's college soccer players
Glen Cove High School alumni
American expatriate sportspeople in England